Sir Alexander Gibb & Partners was a British firm of consulting civil engineers, based at Queen Anne's Lodge, Queen Anne's Gate and subsequently Telford House, Tothill Street, Westminster, London, until 1974, when it relocated to Earley House, 427 London Road, Reading, Berkshire.

The firm had been founded in 1922 by noted Scottish civil engineer, Brigadier-General Sir Alexander Gibb.

For the first ten years the business was not very rewarding financially although it was engaged on several important projects. Gibb and his colleague, noted electrical engineer Charles Hesterman Merz, designed Barking Power Station and later the Galloway Hydro Electric development, the first major work of its kind to be linked to the National Grid.
 
Gibb resolved to make his firm the largest of its kind in the country and in time, the firm grew to the point where it was responsible for projects in several parts of the world.

By the late 1980s/early 1990s, the firm was organised as a number of specialised departments in Reading, namely Water and Energy (WAE), Transportation and Marine (TAM), Structures and Services (SAS), Project Management Services (PMS) and Gibb Architects. Outside of the United Kingdom, the firm had associated practices including Gibb Africa (headquartered in Nairobi, Kenya), Gibb Botswana (operating from Gaborone) Gibb Petermuller (Headquartered in Athens) and Gibb Mauritius.

In 1989, the firm merged with the larger American company, Law, which then sold Gibb to the US-based Jacobs Engineering Group in 2001.

Operations

During the 1930s, under the direction of Hugh Beaver, the firm brought together architecture and mechanical services with the founding focus on heavy civil engineering, and so was able to offer to industrial clients a complete service.
 
In 1939 Sir Alexander Gibb & Partners designed three large ordnance factories for the Ministry of Supply; three other smaller factories followed later.
 
Other notable designs were the Kincardine Bridge, Guinness and Company's brewery at Park Royal, the Captain Cook graving dock at Sydney, Australia, the Singapore naval base, supervision of construction of Phoenix units for the Mulberry harbours and an underground factory for aeroplane engines at Corsham.

Between 1930 and 1936, the firm designed the modernist power stations of the Galloway hydro-electric power scheme.

In 1936, it designed the Kincardine Bridge across the Firth of Forth, then Britain's largest road bridge.

In 1937, the firm designed the Capper Pass and Son Smelting Works (as well as a row of houses) in Hull.

In 1939, it designed the new Allied Bakeries building, in St Pauls Cray (near Orpington). Originally the Tip Top Bakery in Cray Avenue, now part of the Allied Bakeries division of Associated British Foods.

During World War II, the Drakelow Tunnels near Kidderminster were designed and constructed.

In 1949, Cliff Quay Power Station in Suffolk was designed.

In 1968, Sir Alexander Gibb & Partners was joint consulting engineer on the Cleddau Bridge in Wales.

Other later works included the Tripoli International Airport (1978), Devonport Dockyard, Limehouse Link tunnel (1989-1993), Great Man-Made River Project in Libya and several defence and airport projects in the Middle East.

In the UK, the firm also worked on Waterloo International Railway Terminal between 1988 and 1993, with Grimshaw Architects and Bovis Construction (as the main contractors), Brook House in Park Lane in London (with Squire and Partners), Reading Crown Courts and HMP Banstead, Surrey.

The firm also undertook a number of important hydro-electric dam projects including the design and supervision of Tongariro Hydroelectric Scheme, (New Zealand), Lar Dam (Iran), Victoria Dam (Sri Lanka) (1975-1985), the Samanalawewa Dam project, (Sri Lanka) (1993), Maentwrog New Dam, Wales  (1928) and Owen Falls Dam (1954), Uganda.

Problems emerged on the Samanalawewa project and two years after its completion, its reservoir still could not be filled because its base was leaking. One Sri Lankan geologist has warned: "Samanalawewa is a write off". Also, the Victoria Dam in Sri Lanka has not produced the amount of energy envisaged by the designer.

In 1997, remedial works were carried out on Owen Falls dam under supervision by the consulting firm.

In June 1994, GibbAnglian, a partnership created by Sir Alexander Gibb and Partners and Anglian Water International, won a two-year contract from the United Kingdom Government'sOverseas Development Administration to study the impact of industrial effluent in the city of Tianjin in China. The partnership's task was to investigate the technical, institutional, environmental, and financial issues involved in reducing industrial wastewater production and improving the quality of effluent discharges.

Notable Engineers who worked at Sir Alexander Gibb & Partners
 Brigadier-General Sir Alexander Gibb, GBE, CB, FRS[1] (1872 – 1958), was a noted Scottish civil engineer, who founded Sir Alexander Gibb and Partners in 1921
 Sir Angus Paton, civil engineer (1905–1999), worked on several hydro-electric dam projects across the world and became a partner of the firm in 1955.
 Geoffrey Hamilton Coates (1924 - ) was non-secretarial director of Gibb Consultants Limited as a chartered engineer
 Hugh Beaver, (1890 – 1967) was a British engineer, industrialist, and founder of the Guinness Book of Records.
 John Britten (1950 - 1995), mechanical engineer, worked briefly on the design of the highway linking the M1 motorway to the M4 motorway.
 Angus Goodwille, MBE
 Sir Leopold Halliday Savile, KCB, MICE (1870 – 1953) was a Scottish civil engineer who specialised in the design and construction of reservoirs. He served as President of the Institution of Civil Engineers between November 1940 and November 1941.
Prof. Paul Back CBE joined 1955 assoc. 1967–70, partner 1970–89, co director and chief tech director 1989–95; visiting prof of design Univ of Oxford 1992-1998

References
Alexander Gibb, The story of an engineer by Geoffrey Harrison

Engineering consulting firms of the United Kingdom